Microsoft WebMatrix is a discontinued cloud-connected website builder and HTML editor for Windows, geared towards web development. WebMatrix enables developers to build websites using built-in templates or popular open-source applications, with full support for ASP.NET, PHP, Node.js and HTML5. Microsoft developed WebMatrix for the purpose of providing web developers with coding, customization, and publishing capabilities all in one place.

History
WebMatrix is a successor of ASP.NET Web Matrix, which was released in 2003 and later discontinued.

In 2011, WebMatrix was released to support the large number of open source content management systems and to provide a lightweight web development environment for PHP and the new, simplified ASP.NET web pages. It focused on a clean, simple user interface allowing web developers to build websites from scratch or by customizing open-source web content management systems such as Orchard, DotNetNuke, Umbraco, Joomla!, Drupal and WordPress.

From 2011 to 2012, WebMatrix 2 Beta and RC releases added support for Node.js, mobile simulators, additional website templates, and support publishing to Microsoft Azure web sites. On September 6, 2012, the official release of WebMatrix 2 went public. The release of WebMatrix 3 was made available on May 1, 2013. Unlike WebMatrix 2, WebMatrix 3 requires Windows 7 or later.

In 2016, Microsoft announced the discontinuation of WebMatrix in favour of Visual Studio Code with formal support ending on November 1, 2017.

Features
 Simplified creation, publishing, and synchronization of companion cloud websites
 Integration with source control systems including Git and Team Foundation Server
 Code completion and syntax highlighting for HTML5, CSS3, JavaScript and TypeScript
 Editing for server-side languages ASP.NET, PHP and Node.js
 Support for jQuery, jQuery Mobile, Less and Sass
 Mobile simulators
 Database manager for MySQL, Microsoft SQL Server and SQL CE
 Deployment tools for files and database
 Deployment to either shared hosting, dedicated servers or Microsoft Azure
 Publishing websites using FTP, FTPS and Web Deploy (an IIS feature for publishing websites)
 Built-in search engine optimization and performance reports
 Remote and offline editing
 Downloading remote sites for local editing
 Database migration from SQL Server Compact 4.0 database to SQL Server Express or SQL Server
 Extensibility through plug-ins

See also
 Visual Studio Code

References

Further reading

External links
 
 WebMatrix at IIS.NET website

Microsoft development tools
Web development software
Discontinued Microsoft software